The Acerentomidae are a family of hexapods in the order Protura. Acerentomids are not tracheated, and instead use cuticular gas exchange.

Genera
These genera are members of the family Acerentomidae.

 Acerella Berlese, 1909
 Acerentomon Silvestri, 1907
 Acerentuloides Ewing, 1921
 Acerentulus Berlese, 1908
 Alaskaentomon Nosek, 1977
 Amazonentulus Yin, 1989
 Amphientulus Tuxen, 1981
 Andinentulus Tuxen, 1984
 Australentulus Tuxen, 1967
 Baculentulus Tuxen, 1977
 Berberentulus Tuxen, 1963
 Bolivaridia Bonet, 1942
 Brasilentulus Nosek, 1973
 Brasilidia Nosek, 1973
 Callientomon Yin, 1980
 Chosonentulus Imadaté & Szeptycki, 1976
 Delamarentulus Tuxen, 1963
 Filientomon Rusek, 1974
 Fjellbergella Nosek, 1978
 Gracilentulus Tuxen, 1963
 Huashanentulus Yin, 1980
 Imadateiella Rusek, 1974
 Kenyentulus Tuxen, 1981
 Liaoxientulus Wu & Yin, 2011
 Madagascaridia Nosek, 1978
 Maderentulus Tuxen, 1963
 Najtentulus Szeptycki & Weiner, 1997
 Nanshanentulus Bu & Yin, 2007
 Neobaculentulus Yin, 1984
 Nienna Szeptycki, 1988
 Nipponentomon Imadaté & Yosii, 1959
 Noldo Szeptycki, 1988
 Nosekiella Rusek, 1974
 Nosekientomon Shrubovych, Rusek & Bernard, 2014
 Notentulus Yin, 1989
 Orinentomon Yin & Xie, 1993
 Paracerella Imadaté, 1980
 Podolinella Szeptycki, 1995
 Polyadenum Yin, 1980
 Proacerella Bernard, 1975
 Silvestridia Bonet, 1942
 Sugaentulus Imadaté, 1978
 Tasmanentulus Tuxen, 1986
 Tuxenentulus Imadaté, 1974
 Tuxenidia Nosek & Cvijovic, 1969
 Verrucoentomon Rusek, 1974
 Vesiculentomon Rusek, 1974
 Vindobonella Szeptycki & Christian, 2001
 Wenyingia Imadaté, 1986
 Yamatentomon Imadaté, 1964
 Yavanna Szeptycki, 1988
 Yichunentulus Yin, 1980
 Yinentulus Tuxen, 1986
 Zangentulus Yin, 1983

References

Protura
Taxa named by Filippo Silvestri
Arthropod families